Braun is a common surname, originating from the German word for the color brown. The name is the 22nd most common family name in Germany. Many German emigrants to the United States also changed their name to Brown (see Brown (surname)).

In German, Braun is pronounced  – except for the "r", equal to the English word "brown". In English, it is often pronounced like "brawn". Pronunciation is an individual preference and is hard to guess unless one is in a position to hear the person's name spoken.

As forename:
 Braun Strowman (formerly Braun Stowman), ring name of American professional wrestler Adam Scherr (born 1983)

As surname:
 Alexander Braun (1805–1877), German botanist
 Anna Maria Braun (born 3 July 1979), German business executive and lawyer
 Annette Frances Braun (1884–1978), American entomologist
 Arthur Michael Braun (1910–1989), American politician and businessman
 Ben Braun (born 1953), American college basketball coach
 Bob Braun (1929–2001), Cincinnati television personality
 Carol Moseley Braun (born 1947), American politician and lawyer
 Carl Braun (basketball) (1927–2010), American basketball player and coach
 Carl Braun (bass) (1886–1960), German opera singer, bass
 Carl Braun (obstetrician) (1822–1891), Austrian obstetrician (knighted to Carl Ritter von Fernwald Braun)
 Christian Braun (born 2001), American basketball player
 Colin Braun (born 1988), race car driver
 Dagmar Braun Celeste (born 1942), first lady of Ohio
 Egidius Braun (1925–2022), president of the German Soccer Association (1992-201)
 Émile Braun (1849–1927), Belgian liberal politician, Mayor of Ghent
 Emma Lucy Braun (1889–1971), American botanist and ecologist
 Emmy Braun (1826–1904), German cookbook author
 Ernest Braun (1925–2015), British-Austrian technology assessor
 Eva Braun (1912–1945), longtime companion of Adolf Hitler
 Franziska Braun (died 1976), mother of Eva Braun
 Friedrich Braun (1862–1942), Russian-German philologist
 Gregor Braun (born 1955), German bicycle racer
 Grzegorz Braun (born 1967), Polish journalist, media director and politician
 György Bálint (originally surname Braun; 1919–2020), Hungarian horticulturist, Candidate of Agricultural Sciences, journalist, author, and politician who served as an MP.
 Győző Braun (1911–1972), Hungarian and British table tennis champion, better known as Viktor Barna
 Hanns Braun (1886–1918), German athlete
 Heinrich Friedrich Wilhelm Braun (1862–1934), German surgeon
 Hel Braun (1914–1986), German mathematician
 Helena Braun (1903–1990), German soprano
 Helge Braun (born 1972), German politician
 Isabella Braun (1815–1886), German writer
 Jayme Caetano Braun (1924–1999), Brazilian folk musician, composer and poet
 Jerzy Braun (disambiguation), several people
 Johanna Braun (1929–2008), German writer
 Jürgen Braun (born 1961), German politician
 Justin Braun (born 1987), American ice hockey player
 Karl Ferdinand Braun (1850–1918), German physicist and inventor
 Lasse Braun (born Alberto Ferrero, 1936–2015), Franco-Italian director
 Lilian Jackson Braun (1913–2011), American writer
 Lily Braun (1865–1916), German feminist writer
 Ma Braun (1881–1956), Dutch swimming coach
 Marie Braun (1911–1982), Dutch swimmer, daughter of Ma Braun
 Matt Braun (born 1932), American writer of Western novels
 Matthias Braun (Czech: Matyáš Bernard Braun; 1684–1738), sculptor and carver 
 Maurice Braun (1877–1941), American painter
 Michael Braun (footballer) (born 1978), Australian rules footballer
 Mike Braun (born 1954), American businessman and politician in Indiana
 Nicholas Braun (born 1988), American actor
 Otto Braun (1872–1955), German Social Democratic politician and prime minister of Prussia
 Otto Braun (communist) (1900–1974), German communist and representative of the Comintern
 Ralf Braun (born 1973), German backstroke swimmer
 Ralph Braun (1940–2013), American businessman
 Rick Braun (born 1955), American jazz trumpet player
 Russell Braun, Canadian operatic lyric baritone, son of Victor Braun
 Ryan Braun (born 1983), American MVP baseball player
 Sabine Braun (born 1965), German athlete
 Sanford Braun, better known as Sandy Koufax (born 1935), American Major League Baseball Hall of Fame pitcher
 Steve Braun (disambiguation), several people
 Tamara Braun (born 1971), American actor
 Victor Braun, Canadian-born operatic baritone, father of Russell Braun
 Volker Braun (born 1939), German writer
 Wernher von Braun (1912–1977), German-American rocket scientist

See also 
 Braun (disambiguation)
 Brauneis
 Brawn (disambiguation)
 Brown (surname)
 Browne
 Brauner

German-language surnames
Jewish surnames
Surnames from nicknames
Russian Mennonite surnames